The 0s BC were the period between 9 BC and 1 BC, the last nine years of the before Christ era. It is one of two "0-to-9" decade-like timespans that contain nine years, along with the 0s.

This is a list of events occurring in the 0s BC ordered by year.

Significant people
 Tigranes IV, King of Armenia, r. 12–1 BC
 Erato, Queen of Armenia, 8–5 BC, 2 BC – AD 2, AD 6–11
 Artavasdes III, King of Armenia, r. 5–2 BC
 Jesus Christ, Jewish preacher and central figure of Christianity, (ca. 4 BC–ca. AD 33)
 Ariobarzan of Atropatene, Client King of Armenia, r. 1 BC – AD 2
 Chend Di, Emperor of Han Dynasty China, r. 32–7 BC
 Ai Di, Emperor of Han Dynasty China, r. 7–1 BC
 Ping Di, Emperor of Han Dynasty China, r. 1 BC – AD 5
 Wang Mang, Chinese statesman and future emperor of China
 Dong Xian, Han Dynasty Chinese official under Emperor Ai of Han
 Antiochus III, King of Commagene, r. 12 BC – AD 17
 Arminius, Germanic war chief (18/17 BC – AD 21)
 Arshak II, King of Caucasian Iberia, r. 20 BC – AD 1
 Strato II and Strato III, co-kings of the Indo-Greek Kingdom, r. 25 BC – AD 10
 Lugaid Riab nDerg, legendary High King of Ireland, r. 33–9 BC
 Conchobar Abradruad, legendary High King of Ireland, r. 9–8 BC
 Crimthann Nia Náir, legendary High King of Ireland, r. (8 BC – AD 9)
 Suinin, legendary Emperor of Japan, r. 29 BC – AD 70
 Amanishakheto, King of Kush, r. 10–1 BC
 Natakamani, King of Kush, r. 1 BC – AD 20
 Ma'nu III, King of Osroene, r. 23–4 BC
 Abgar V, King of Osroene, r. 4 BC-AD 7, AD 13–50
 Phraates IV, king of the Parthian Empire, r. 38–2 BC
 Phraates V, king of the Parthian Empire, r. 2 BC – AD 4
 Musa of Parthia, mother and co-ruler with Phraates V, r. 2 BC – AD 4
 Caesar Augustus, Roman Emperor (27 BC – AD 14)
 Nero Claudius Drusus, Roman Consul, in office 9 BC
 Gaius Caesar, Roman general
 Livy, Roman historian
 Ovid, Roman poet
 Quirinius, Roman nobleman and politician
 Tiberius, Roman general, statesman, and future emperor.
 Herod the Great, client king of Judea
 Hillel the Elder, Jewish scholar and Nasi of the Sanhedrin, in office c. 31 BC – AD 9
 Shammai, Jewish scholar and Av Beit Din of the Sanhedrin, in office 20 BC – AD 20
 Hyeokgeose, King of Silla, r. 57 BC – AD 4

References